L.A. Law: The Movie is a 2002 American made-for-television drama film based on the 1986–1994 television series L.A. Law which reunited most of the original cast, although not all prominent cast members returned, including Blair Underwood (Jonathan Rollins), Jimmy Smits (Victor Sifuentes), Amanda Donohoe (C.J. Lamb) and John Spencer (Tommy Mullaney). The film aired on NBC on May 12, 2002.

The film's initial working title was L.A. Law: Return To Justice.

Synopsis
In the eight years since the series ended, founding senior partner Leland McKenzie has retired and left Douglas Brackman Jr. as the senior managing partner. New employees to the firm are Brackman's over-achieving son, Jason, who's at odds with his father, and ambitious, conniving associate Chloe Carpenter, who's at odds with others. Former partner Michael Kuzak, now retired and a successful restaurant owner, is called back to help stop the impending execution of a former client. The opposing counsel is Kuzak's old flame Grace Van Owen, who had since been elected District Attorney. Meanwhile, divorce lawyer Arnie Becker deals with a really tough divorce: his own. Arnie's estranged young wife has hired former McKenzie Brackman lawyer Abby Perkins. Office manager Roxanne Melman deals with her ex-husband, Dave Meyer, who claims that he's dying and wants to spend some quality time with her. Also, married partners Ann Kelsey and Stuart Markowitz find themselves the victims of a scam artist.

Cast and crew
Corbin Bernsen - Arnie Becker
Susan Dey - D.A. Grace Van Owen
Larry Drake - Benny Stulwicz
Richard Dysart - Leland McKenzie
Jill Eikenberry - Ann Kelsey
Dann Florek - Dave Meyer
Michele Greene - Abby Perkins
Harry Hamlin - Michael Kuzak
Alan Rachins - Douglas Brackman, Jr.
Susan Ruttan - Roxanne Melman
Michael Tucker - Stuart Markowitz
Bruce Davison - Lawrence Diebenkorn
Steven Williams - Albert Hutchinson
Gedde Watanabe - Cyril 
Josie Davis - Chloe Carpenter
Jason Peck - Jason Brackman
Bruklin Harris - Raylene Hutchinson
Hrothgar Mathews - Warren
Claudette Mink - Belinda James
Ingrid Torrance - Lara Becker
Kevin McNulty - Max Bettencart

References

External links
 

2002 television films
2002 films
2000s legal drama films
American legal drama films
Television series reunion films
Films based on television series
Television films based on television series
Films set in Los Angeles
NBC network original films
20th Century Fox Television films
American drama television films
Films directed by Michael Schultz
2000s American films